On 22 January 2014, a strong French column of more than a hundred soldiers transported by armored vehicles out of the city of Timbuktu and turns towards the northwest, then turns east after traveling fifty kilometers.

On the night of January 22 to 23, the French attacked a group of jihadists in the desert about 130 kilometers north of Timbuktu. The fight takes place south of the village of Kondaoui where jihadists were probably come to stock up on food and water. One resident said the French attack with Special Forces soldiers backed by helicopters.

Officially, according to the French general staff, a dozen "terrorists" were killed and a French soldier is injured as a result of an "act of opportunity." According to French and Malian military, the picture is more precisely 11 dead on the rebel side and a Salafi injured prognosis uncommitted for French. In addition, two pickup jihadists were destroyed. At least one of the dead is identified jihadists; Algeria's Abdelkader Ben Boucha, 33, from El Oued.

References

2014 in Mali
Conflicts in 2014
Battles involving France
Gao Region
Mali War
January 2014 events in Africa

Battles in 2014